Bishop Viard College, also known as Viard College or BVC, is a coeducational, integrated, secondary school (years 7–13) located in Kenepuru, Porirua, New Zealand.

History
The college was founded in 1968 by Cardinal Peter McKeefry, Archbishop of Wellington, and was staffed by the Assumptionist Fathers and the Brigidine Sisters. The school was named after Philippe Viard, the first Catholic Bishop of Wellington. Originally the school consisted of two institutions (for boys and girls) on the same site, however it became a single co-educational unit in 1975.

The school celebrated its 50th Jubilee on Labour weekend, 19–21 October 2018.

Notable alumni

 Brent Anderson – rugby union player
 Izzy Ford – local-body politician and former rugby union player
 Faifili Levave – rugby union player
 Vince Mellars – rugby league and rugby union player
 Anthony Perenise – rugby union player
 John Schwalger – rugby union player

References
General

 Lillian G. Keys, Philip Viard, Bishop of Wellington, Pegasus Press, Christchurch, 1968.
 Ernest Richard Simmons, Brief history of the Catholic Church in New Zealand, Catholic Publications Centre, Auckland, 1978.
 Michael King, God's farthest outpost : a history of Catholics in New Zealand, Viking, Auckland 1997.
 Michael O'Meeghan S.M., Steadfast in hope : the story of the Catholic Archdiocese of Wellington 1850–2000, Dunmore press, Palmerston North, 2003.
 
 Te Kete Ipurangi

Specific

External links
 School website

Educational institutions established in 1968
Catholic secondary schools in the Wellington Region
Schools in Porirua
1968 establishments in New Zealand